Roger William Allam (born 26 October 1953) is a British actor, who has performed on stage, in film, on television and radio.

He played Inspector Javert in the original London production of the stage musical Les Misérables, First Officer Douglas Richardson in the award-winning radio series Cabin Pressure, and DCI Fred Thursday in the TV series Endeavour. He is also known for his roles as Illyrio Mopatis in the HBO series Game of Thrones, Royalton in Speed Racer, Lewis Prothero in the 2005 adaptation of V for Vendetta and as Peter Mannion MP in The Thick Of It.

He has been nominated a Laurence Olivier Award six times, winning thrice.

Life and career 
Allam was born in Bow, London, England. He was educated at Christ's Hospital and Manchester University. His father was rector of St Mary Woolnoth.

He played Mercutio for the Royal Shakespeare Company, in 1983.

From 1985 to 1986, he played Inspector Javert in the original London production of the stage musical Les Misérables.

He has also appeared in many radio dramas for the BBC. In 2001, he starred in BBC Radio 4's adaptation of Les Misérables, as Valjean. In 2000 he played Adolf Hitler at the Royal National Theatre in David Edgar's Albert Speer. He won an Olivier Award as Best Actor 2001, for his role as Captain Terri Denis in a revival of Privates on Parade, opening in December 2001 at the Donmar Warehouse, Covent Garden. In November 2002 at the Comedy Theatre he co-starred with Gillian Anderson in Michael Weller's romantic comedy What the Night Is For.

In 2003, he appeared as former West German federal chancellor Willy Brandt in Michael Frayn's play Democracy which opened at the Cottesloe Theatre, in the Royal National Theatre. He stayed with the show for its transfer to the West End. In December 2004 and January 2005, Allam appeared as the villainous Abanazar in a pantomime of Aladdin at the Old Vic theatre, co-starring Ian McKellen, Maureen Lipman and Sam Kelly. He reprised this role at the Old Vic, once again with Ian McKellen and Frances Barber in 2006–07.  In August 2005, Allam appeared in Blackbird by David Harrower alongside Jodhi May at the Edinburgh Festival in a production by German star director Peter Stein. The play transferred to the Albery Theatre in London in February 2006. Blackbird subsequently won a best new play award.

In 2006 he appeared in Stephen Frears's film The Queen, starring Oscar-winner Dame Helen Mirren, as the Queen's private secretary. In February 2007, he performed in the 1960s farce Boeing-Boeing at the Comedy Theatre in the West End, co-starring Mark Rylance, Frances de la Tour and Tamzin Outhwaite. In 2007, he appeared for the first time as Peter Mannion MP in the special episodes of the BBC comedy The Thick of It. He reprised the role in the third series (2009), and returned in the final series (2012) as part of the expanded regular cast.

In 2008, Allam played the role of Max Reinhardt, the Salzburg Festival impresario in Michael Frayn's play Afterlife, the production staged by Michael Blakemore on the National Theatre's Lyttelton stage. In 2009, Allam played Albin/Zaza in La Cage aux Folles at the Playhouse in London. Allam played Falstaff in Henry IV, Part 1 and Henry IV, Part 2 at Shakespeare's Globe, in the 2010 season. He won the Olivier Award for Best Actor. In October 2010, Allam was reunited with his former cast mates from Les Misérables in the 25th anniversary concert for a performance of "One Day More".

In January 2012, he starred in the first series of Endeavour, the prequel to the long-running Inspector Morse, playing the gruff but kind-hearted Detective Inspector Fred Thursday, young Endeavour Morse's mentor in 1960s Oxford. By 2018 Allam had portrayed his central character in five additional well-received series, which are also aired in America as part of the PBS Masterpiece Mystery! series. In March 2019, the show's sixth season had concluded on ITV, was scheduled for broadcast in the summer in the United States, and had been recommissioned for a seventh season to be set in 1970.

In April 2012 he also starred as Serebrayakov in the play Uncle Vanya by Anton Chekhov at the Chichester Festival Theatre. In 2013 he played the role of  Prospero in William Shakespeare's play The Tempest at Shakespeare's Globe theatre in London alongside Colin Morgan as Ariel.  Allam presented Michael Frayn at the 2013 Olivier Awards with a Special Lifetime Award which was aired by ITV1. Allam has also reteamed with Stephen Frears in Tamara Drewe, the film version of Posy Simmond's popular comic strip. He plays the crime novelist Nicholas Hardiment, who is bewitched by London journalist Tamara Drewe, played by Gemma Arterton. In the closing chapter of his Timebends autobiography (1987) Arthur Miller writes of Allam: "To play Adrian....in the 1986 Royal Shakespeare Company production of The Archbishop's Ceiling, Roger Allam gave up the leading role as Javert in the monster hit Les Misérables because he had done it over sixty times and thought my play more challenging for him at that moment of his career. Nor did he consider his decision a particularly courageous one. This is part of what a theatre culture means and it is something few New York actors would have the sense of security even to dream of doing."

Allam narrated the Channel 4 series The Auction House.

In October and November 2016 Allam appeared as Brigadier Adrian Stone in the BBC series The Missing.

Since January 2020, Allam has co-starred with Joanna Lumley in the BBC Radio 4 comedy drama series Conversations from a Long Marriage. As of February 2023, the show is in its fourth series.

In March 2022, Allam debuted in the lead role of Antoine Verlaque in Murder in Provence, a BritBox cosy crime drama based on the Verlaque & Bonnet detective novels by ML Longworth, alongside Nancy Carroll (The Crown) as his romantic partner Marine Bonnet.

Allam voices the demon Azazel in the 2022 Netflix adaptation of Neil Gaiman's The Sandman.

Personal life
Allam is married to actress Rebecca Saire, with whom he has two sons, William, an actor, and Thomas. He, Rebecca and William appeared together in the Endeavour episode Raga (series 7, episode 2, broadcast February 2020). In that episode, Rebecca and William played mother and son.

He identifies as being on the political left, and has also publicly castigated Donald Trump.

Theatre

Filmography

Film

Television

Radio

Audiobooks 
Allam has narrated several audiobooks, including Solar by Ian McEwan.

References

External links 

 

Roger Allam at British Comedy Guide

1953 births
Alumni of the University of Manchester
English male film actors
English male musical theatre actors
English male radio actors
English male stage actors
English male television actors
English male voice actors
Laurence Olivier Award winners
Living people
Male actors from London
People educated at Christ's Hospital
People from Bow, London
20th-century English male actors
21st-century English male actors
Royal Shakespeare Company members